Jiří Adamíra (2 April 1926 in Dobrovice – 14 August 1993 in Prague) was a Czech actor. Adamíra began as an actor in the season 1945–1946 and from 1946 to 1950 worked under the director Jiří Dalík in the theatre. He later appeared in 21 films between 1952 and 1989, and in 22 television series.

Selected filmography
... a pátý jezdec je Strach 
Jeden z nich je vrah
Podezření
Modlitba pro Kateřinu Horowitzovou
Příběh lásky a cti
Božská Ema
Nevěsta k zulíbání
Oldřich a Božena
Hra v oblacích
Lev s bílou hřívou
Poločas štěstí
Stíhán a podezřelý
Třicet případů majora Zemana
Dobrodružství kriminalistiky

References

External links
 

1926 births
1993 deaths
People from Dobrovice
Czech male film actors
Czech male stage actors
Czech male television actors
20th-century Czech male actors
Burials at Vyšehrad Cemetery